Tamgrinia is a genus of Asian funnel weavers first described by Pekka T. Lehtinen in 1967.

Species
 it contains eight species:

Tamgrinia alveolifera (Schenkel, 1936) – India, China
Tamgrinia coelotiformis (Schenkel, 1963) – China
Tamgrinia laticeps (Schenkel, 1936) – China
Tamgrinia palpator (Hu & Li, 1987) – China
Tamgrinia rectangularis Xu & Li, 2006 – China
Tamgrinia semiserrata Xu & Li, 2006 – China
Tamgrinia tibetana (Hu & Li, 1987) – China
Tamgrinia tulugouensis Wang, 2000 – China

References

External links

Agelenidae
Araneomorphae genera
Spiders of Asia
Taxa named by Pekka T. Lehtinen